The following is a Mackerras pendulum for the New South Wales state election 2007.

"Safe" seats require a swing of over 10 per cent to change, "fairly safe" seats require a swing of between 6 and 10 points, while "marginal" seats require a swing of less than 6 points.

Legislative Assembly
Changes in the pendulum since the 2007 election resulted through by-elections in the Labor held seats of Ryde in 2008 and Penrith in 2010. Both seats were won by the Liberal opposition in record swings against the Labor Government of 25 points in Penrith and 23 points in Ryde.

Pendulum

Legislative Council

Labor MLC Michael Costa resigned on 22 September 2008. Unions NSW secretary John Robertson was nominated by Labor as his successor, and was formally appointed at a joint sitting of parliament on 28 October.

Gordon Moyes was appointed in 2002 as a member of the Christian Democratic Party to fill the casual vacancy caused by Elaine Nile's resignation from the Legislative Council. He was elected in 2003. Having been expelled from the party in March 2009, he sat as an independent until November 2009 when he joined the Family First Party.

Labor MLC Henry Tsang resigned effective 3 December 2009. Former Mayor of the City of Rockdale Shaoquett Moselmane was nominated by Labor as his successor, and was formally appointed at a joint sitting of parliament on 3 December.

On 7 June 2010, Labor Minister Ian Macdonald resigned from the Legislative Council after resigning from the ministry when it was discovered that he had mis-used taxpayer funds to fund a private holiday in Europe. In total, 12 of the 22 Ministers sworn in after the last State election have resigned or been replaced to date. Assistant general secretary of the NSW branch of the ALP Luke Foley was nominated by Labor as his successor, and was formally appointed at a joint sitting of parliament on 10 June 2010.

Greens MLC Lee Rhiannon resigned on 19 July 2010 to contest a seat for the Federal Senate at the 2010 election. The death of Shooters and Fishers Party MLC Roy Smith on 30 July 2010 and the resignations of Labor MLC John Della Bosca on 30 July and Greens MLC Sylvia Hale on 6 September left four vacancies, which were filled by Cate Faehrmann, Robert Borsak, Sophie Cotsis and David Shoebridge respectively on 7 September 2010.

Current balance

References

Pendulums for New South Wales state elections